The Molnár János Cave is a thermokarstic water-filled cave system. It is located in the Rózsadomb district of Budapest in Hungary.

The deepest sections reach , while the total length of explored sections is currently . The cave mouth is just  from the Danube.

References 

Caves of Hungary
Geography of Budapest
Underwater diving sites in Hungary